Račiněves is a municipality and village in Litoměřice District in the Ústí nad Labem Region of the Czech Republic. It has about 600 inhabitants.

Archaeology
Račiněves is home to an important archaeological site, at which numerous stone tools dating to the Lower Palaeolithic were found.

Gallery

References

Villages in Litoměřice District